Margaretha Anna (Bibi) Dumon Tak (born 21 December 1964) is a Dutch writer of children's literature.  After completing her degree in Dutch Literature, in 2001 Bibi Dumon Tak began her career as a children's non-fiction author with Het koeienboek (The Cow Book, 2001).

Career 

Dumon Tak made her debut in 2002 with the book Het koeienboek. She won the Zilveren Griffel award for this book. She went on to win the Zilveren Griffel award several more times in the years that followed: in 2004 for Camera loopt... Actie!, in 2007 for Bibi’s bijzondere beestenboek and in 2010 for Fiet wil rennen.

Her book Camera loopt... Actie! takes a look behind the scenes of the 2003 film Polleke which itself is based on children's books written by Guus Kuijer.

In 2006, she wrote the book Laika tussen de sterren which was the Kinderboekenweekgeschenk on the occasion of the annual Boekenweek, based on the life of Laika, the first animal in space. In 2012, she won the Gouden Griffel award for her book Winterdieren.

Several of Dumon Tak's books have been translated into English by Laura Watkinson. Watkinson's publisher won the Mildred L. Batchelder Award in 2012 for the book Soldier Bear and 2015 for the book Mikis and the Donkey.

In 2018, she won the Theo Thijssen-prijs for her entire oeuvre.

In 2019, her book Laat een boodschap achter in het zand (illustrated by Annemarie van Haeringen) was on the shortlist for the Jan Wolkers Prijs.

Dumon Tak's books have been illustrated by various illustrators including Fleur van der Weel, Fiel van der Veen and Fiep Westendorp. Her books have been published by Querido.

Personal life 

Dumon Tak is married to Jan Paul Schutten who is also an award-winning writer of Dutch children's literature.

Awards 
 2002: Zilveren Griffel, Het koeienboek
 2004: Zilveren Griffel, Camera loopt... Actie!
 2007: Zilveren Griffel, Bibi’s bijzondere beestenboek
 2010: Zilveren Griffel, Fiet wil rennen
 2012: Gouden Griffel, Winterdieren
 2017: Zilveren Griffel, Siens hemel
 2018: Theo Thijssen-prijs, entire oeuvre
 2018: Vlag en Wimpel, Het heel grote vogelboek
 2019: Zilveren Griffel, Laat een boodschap achter in het zand

References

External links 
 Bibi Dumon Tak, Nederlands Letterenfonds
 Bibi Dumon Tak (in Dutch), Digital Library for Dutch Literature

1964 births
Living people
Dutch children's writers
20th-century Dutch women writers
21st-century Dutch women writers
Dutch women children's writers
Gouden Griffel winners